Paul Powell (born 30 June 1978) is an English former professional footballer. He played as a midfielder, making nearly 180 league appearances for Oxford United between 1994 and 2003.

References

External links

1978 births
Living people
People from Wallingford, Oxfordshire
English footballers
Association football midfielders
Oxford United F.C. players
Tamworth F.C. players
Didcot Town F.C. players
Milton United F.C. players
English Football League players